Jorge Pina Pérez (born 26 January 1977) is a Spanish sabre fencer and a two-time Olympic fencer. He seeded 7th in the individual competition at the Beijing Olympics. He won a bronze medal at the 2005 Almería.

References

External links
 

1977 births
Living people
Spanish male sabre fencers
Olympic fencers of Spain
Fencers at the 2000 Summer Olympics
Fencers at the 2008 Summer Olympics
Fencers from Madrid
Universiade medalists in fencing
Mediterranean Games bronze medalists for Spain
Mediterranean Games medalists in fencing
Competitors at the 2005 Mediterranean Games
Universiade bronze medalists for Spain
Medalists at the 1999 Summer Universiade
21st-century Spanish people